Malaeloa/Aitulagi is a village in American Samoa. The neighboring village to the south is Malaeloa/Ituau. Malaeloa/Aitulagi had a population of 698 in 2010. 

Malaeloa/Aitulagi has a weather station. The highest and lowest recorded temperatures in American Samoa were recorded in Malaeloa/Aitulagi: 99 °F (37.2 °C) on April 27, 1972, and 53 °F (11.6 °C) on March 28, 1962. (The high record is tied with a record at Pago Pago International Airport).

References

Tutuila
Villages in American Samoa